Asia Books is the largest English language bookseller in Thailand. It also sells books and magazines in Thai. It opened in September 1969. The chain has 70 shops throughout Thailand under the Asia Books or Bookazine brand. It also distributes English books and magazines to over 300 outlets.

References

External links 
 Asia Books

Bookshops of Thailand
Retail companies of Thailand
Retail companies established in 1969
1969 establishments in Thailand